Helicarionidae is a family of air-breathing land snails or semi-slugs, terrestrial pulmonate gastropod mollusks in the superfamily Helicarionoidea.

Distribution 
The distribution of Helicarionidae includes the eastern Palearctic, Malagasy, India, south-eastern Asia, Hawaii, and Australia.

Anatomy 
Species of snails within this family make and use love darts made of chitin.

In this family, the number of haploid chromosomes lies between 21 and 30 (according to the values in this table).

Taxonomy 
The family Helicarionidae is nested within the limacoid clade, as shown in the following cladogram :

Genera
The following genera are recognised in the family Helicarionidae:
Subfamily Helicarioninae

Amenixesta 
Antiquarion 
Attenborougharion 
Bathia 
Brevisentis 
Burnettia 
Caldwellia 
Chalepotaxis 
Colmanarion 
Ctenoglypta 
Ctenophila 
Cucullarion 
Dancea 
Delinitesta 
Dendrolamellaria 
Dendronitor 
Dupontia 
Echonitor 
Eddiella 
Einasleighana 
Elatonitor 
Ellarion 
Epiglypta 
Erepta 
Eufretum 
Expocystis 
Fastosarion 
Fenestrarion 
Fijia 
Gudeoconcha 
Harmogenanina 
Helicarion 
Howearion 
Irenella 
Kalidos 
Laconia 
Laocaia 
Levidens 
Limpidarion 
Luinarion 
Mistarion 
Montanocystis 
Mysticarion 
Nesonanina 
Nitor 
Pachystyla 
Palmervillea 
Parmacochlea 
Parmavitrina 
Parmella 
Parmellops 
Peloparion 
Periclocystis 
Petalochlamys 
Plegma 
Pravonitor 
Pseudophasis 
Pseudosaphtia 
Pseudosesara 
Quirosella 
Saphtia 
Sheaia 
Sigaloeista 
Sitalarion 
Stanisicarion 
Tarocystis 
Thularion 
Torrecystis 
Tropicystis 
Urazirochlamys 
Vanmolia 
Westracystis 
Zagmena 

Subfamily Durgellinae Godwin-Austen, 1888

 tribe Durgellini Godwin-Austen, 1888
 Aenigmatoconcha C. Tumpeesuwan & S. Tumpeesuwan, 2017 
 Austenia G. Nevill, 1878
 Cryptaustenia Cockerell, 1891
 Durgella Blanford, 1863 - type genus of the subfamily Durgellinae
 Eurychlamys Godwin-Austen, 1899
 Holkeion Godwin-Austen, 1908
 Ibycus Heynemann, 1863
 Muangnua Solem, 1966
 Nesaecia Gude, 1911
 Pseudaustenia Cockerell, 1891
 Rasama Laidlaw, 1932
 Rhyssotopsis Ancey, 1887
 Rotungia Godwin-Austen, 1918
 Satiella W. T. Blanford & Godwin-Austen, 1908
 Sitala H. Adams, 1865
 Sivella W.T. Blanford, 1863
 Sophina Benson, 1859
 Teraia Solem, 1966
 tribe Girasiini
 Girasia Gray, 1855 - type genus of the tribe Girasiini
 Burmochlamys Pholyotha & Panha, 2022

Unplaced genera
 Advena Gude, 1913
 Apothapsia D. T. Holyoak & G. A. Holyoak, 2020
 Kermarion Iredale, 1944
 Ovachlamys Habe, 1946
 Pittoconcha Preston, 1913
 Ubiquitarion Hyman, Lamborena & Köhler, 2017

References

External links

 Video of a Helicarionid in Sulawesi